Laguna Seca may refer to:
 Laguna Seca Formation, a geologic formation in California
 Laguna Seca (Mexico), see Convention of London
 Laguna Seca (Santa Clara County), a seasonal lake in California
 Laguna Seca, Texas, United States
 Rancho Laguna Seca (Alvires), in Santa Clara County, California
 Rancho Laguna Seca, in Monterey County, California
 WeatherTech Raceway Laguna Seca, a road racing track in California

See also 
 Laguna (disambiguation)